KSTS (channel 48) is a television station licensed to San Jose, California, United States, serving as the San Francisco Bay Area outlet for the Spanish-language network Telemundo. It is owned and operated by NBCUniversal's Telemundo Station Group alongside NBC outlet KNTV (channel 11); it is also sister to regional sports networks NBC Sports Bay Area and NBC Sports California. KSTS and KNTV share studios on North 1st Street in the North San Jose Innovation District; KSTS's transmitter is located on Mount Allison, and two of its main subchannels are also broadcast from the KNTV tower on San Bruno Mountain.

KSTS was established in 1981 to provide subscription television service in the South Bay and Santa Clara Valley. The STV programming ended in 1983, and the station mostly became noted for specialty programming about business and computers as well as some ethnic programs. Telemundo purchased the station in 1987, giving the Bay Area a second station focusing on Spanish-language programming and a second choice for Spanish-language local news.

History

Early years
On March 29, 1978, the Federal Communications Commission (FCC) granted National Group Television a construction permit to build a new television station on channel 48 in San Jose. The permit took the call letters KQWT before becoming KSTS on January 2, 1979. The station first signed on the air on May 31, 1981, as an independent station. It was owned by National Group Television, which was headed by John Douglas. The station's commercial programming included business programs, including a local program called Business Today, as well as old off-network shows. At night, the station originally carried subscription television programming supplied by Satellite Television & Associated Resources (STAR TV) of Santa Monica; STAR had acquired the franchise from Universal Subscription Television three months prior to launch. STAR would have a short run on channel 48 because it bought the Super Time STV service on KTSF and relaunched it as STAR TV that September. It would be replaced by a unique STV offering known as International Network Television, which consisted of three program tiers: two hours a night of Japanese-language shows, another two hours of Chinese-language programming, and a late-night adult film block. Daytime hours were filled by the then-new Financial News Network after it launched in November 1981.

The STV service, with just 3,000 subscribers in February 1983, ended later that year. The station then added additional brokered programming, including several shows on the young computer industry. The Thursday night Affordable Computer Hotline, channel 48's highest-rated show, was one of three devoted to the topic and cemented KSTS's place as "The Computer Connection". The station also rebroadcast the 1984 shareholders meeting of Apple Computer, where the Macintosh was introduced, as the company had been unable to accommodate all those who wanted to attend. However, when must-carry provisions were struck down, KSTS disappeared from several San Francisco-market cable systems; the manager of Viacom Cablevision systems in Marin County said that channel 48 had "phenomenally low ratings". The vast majority of its programming continued to be related to business and computing, as well as sports, wine, and photography, passions linked to its upscale audience. Further, the station aired foreign-language programming in Filipino and Vietnamese, among others, from independent producers.

Telemundo acquisition
In 1987, after several members of National Group Television desired to sell, Douglas sold KSTS to Telemundo Group, Inc., which operated the fledgling Telemundo Spanish-language network, for $17 million. At the insistence of network executive Paul Niedermayer, who had been instrumental in the 1985 launch of KVEA in the Los Angeles area, the network bypassed KCNS channel 38 to buy the station in San Jose, which at the time was home to 35 percent of the Hispanics in the Bay Area. The station, however, was not Spanish around the clock even after the sale. As late as 1990, locally produced programs in Portuguese and Farsi were airing on KSTS. An effort at regional expansion began in 1990 when K15CU "KCU", a KSTS translator, began broadcasting in Salinas.

In October 1990, half of KSTS's 18 employees went on strike in protest of low pay and poor working conditions. The week-long strike, which resulted in temporary suspensions of the station's 6 p.m. newscast and the outright cancellation of its 11 p.m. news, resulted in the station staff unionizing with the International Brotherhood of Electrical Workers and agreeing to a contract in 1992.

The acquisition of Telemundo by NBC in 2002 came at the same time the network bought San Jose's KNTV and turned it into an NBC owned-and-operated station. Both stations moved from their separate facilities—KSTS from its site on Bering Drive—to a new building on First Street.

News operation

In 1988, KSTS launched its news department with the debut of a half-hour 6 p.m. newscast, which was originally co-anchored by Celina Rodriguez and Dante Betteo; both left in 1999. The program proved successful, which resulted in the station later adding a half-hour 11 p.m. newscast. This was canceled after the 1990 strike and was not reinstated until 1997.

In 1999, KSTS hired model Mónica Mesones in 1999 to present the weather, resulting in controversy over the selection.

KSTS expanded its news programming in 2001, launcing a morning newscast, Noticiero 48 Esta Mañana, and a mid-morning newscast, Noticiero 48 Al Mediodía anchored by Blanca Garza and Santiago Aburto. These were canceled in 2004. At this time, César Bayona and Mariate Ramos anchored the 6 p.m. and 11 p.m. newscasts. 2006 saw the dismantling of the local news operation and the creation of a regional news operation to serve the western United States as part of the NBCUni 2.0 cost-cutting initiative. This was later reversed, and local news production was restored at KSTS in 2010. On February 27, 2012, KSTS became the first Spanish language television station in the Bay Area to begin broadcasting its local newscasts in high definition.

2014 saw a series of news expansions at Telemundo, KSTS included. A second attempt at a morning newscast, titled Noticiero Telemundo 48 Primera Edición, began in June, and in November, KSTS launched a 5:30 p.m. newscast as part of a national news expansion; a 10 a.m. newscast also was added to the schedule at this time. Additionally, KSTS received a new set, began producing its own weather segments locally, launched a local Telemundo Responde consumer investigative franchise, added 20 additional staffers to its news department, and began a deeper sharing of resources, including the public affairs program Comunidad del Valle, with KNTV.

Effective June 27, 2016, the morning and 10 a.m. newscasts were canceled in order to begin the production of weekend editions of the 5:30 and 11 p.m. newscasts beginning July 2.

Technical information

Subchannels

The station's digital signal is multiplexed:

Between them, KNTV and KSTS broadcast the same five services (48.3 and 48.4 on the KNTV multiplex simulcast 48.1 and 48.2 on the KSTS multiplex and vice versa for KNTV), though Oxygen is only broadcast by KSTS.

Analog-to-digital conversion
KSTS shut down its analog signal, over UHF channel 48, on June 12, 2009, as part of the federally mandated transition from analog to digital television, and continued broadcasting in digital on channel 49, using virtual channel 48.

The station was repacked from channel 49 to 19 in 2020.

References

External links

STS
Television channels and stations established in 1981
1981 establishments in California
Telemundo Station Group
STS
STS
TeleXitos affiliates
Former General Electric subsidiaries